Remarkable (styled as reMarkable) is an E Ink writing tablet for reading documents and textbooks, sketching and note-taking that attempts to fully replicate paper writing. Developed by a Norwegian startup company of the same name, the device is geared towards students and academics. 

The reMarkable uses electronic paper reading display and tablet computer writing system.

History

The company was founded by Magnus Wanberg and started product development in Oslo in early 2014. It has collaborated with Taiwanese company E Ink. Development was started in 2013 and a crowdfunding campaign launched in late 2016. Pre-orders began in 2017.

Second generation reMarkable 2 was announced on March 17, 2020. It was marketed as the 'World's Thinnest Tablet' (measuring 187 x 246 x 4.7 mm) and sold in batches since mid-2020 for 458 €/US$ including the pen.

Operating system
ReMarkable uses its own operating system, named Codex. Codex is based on Linux and optimized for electronic paper display technology.

Community support 
As Codex is based on Linux and an open source ecosystem, it has gained community projects and 3rd party software for it. The device is accessible through SSH, allowing the installation of 3rd party software. Many packages are accessible through Toltec, a community-maintained free software repository. The Cloud system has been reverse engineered and an open source alternative has been created.

Alternative operating systems 
An alternative free operating system, Parabola-rM, has been made to replace Codex. Parabola-rM aims to turn the device into a full-fledged computer, allowing typical desktop Linux applications to be run.

Subscription
As of October 2021, Connect required a monthly subscription of $5 for its Connect Lite plan or $8 for the Connect plan with unlimited cloud storage.

As of September 2022, some features of the Connect plan, such as integration with file hosting services, were made available to all ReMarkable owners, the Connect plan price was reduced to $2.99 per month, and the Connect Lite plan discontinued with previous subscribers being upgraded to the Connect plan.

Reception
ReMarkable RM100, launched in late 2017, has been criticized due to the sluggishness when loading and unloading files. According to Wired, reMarkable 2 "excels at taking your handwritten notes, but it doesn't do much else well." According to the podcast Bad Voltage, the lack of integrations with other software limits the device's usefulness for taking notes for some users, and there is no official third-party app ecosystem, but the ability to add software via unofficial hacks offers interesting possibilities. ReMarkable's customer service has had many negative reviews as seen on their Instagram page. The company is accused of having poor service to avoid returns on faulty products.

See also 
 Comparison of e-readers
 Sony Digital Paper DPTS1
 Boox
 PocketBook International

References

External links 
 Official webpage of reMarkable | The paper tablet
 reMarkableWiki - Everything about the reMarkable Paper Tablet (Community Wiki)
 A curated list of projects related to the reMarkable tablet

Dedicated ebook devices
Electronic paper technology
Linux-based devices
Electronics companies established in 2016
Crowdfunded consumer goods